Pseudoceratina is a genus of sponge within the family Pseudoceratinidae. They are characterized by possession of a dendritic fiber skeleton lacking laminar bark but containing pith. They have been found in a variety of habitats including the Great Barrier reef, the Red Sea, and Jamaica. Sponges of this genus have a microbiome known to produce a variety of chemicals that are used in pharmaceutical and anti-fouling activities. Notably, a species in this genus produces a chemical that is effective in inhibiting the migration of metastatic breast cancer cells.

Description 
Sponges within the genus Pseudoceratina (originally named Psammaplysilla) are identified by possession of a dendritic fiber skeleton containing only pith elements while lacking the laminar bark that can be found in other sponges. Several species have been described as yellow in color, but oxidizes in air and turns a dark yellowish-green, with variations in growth type including plates, tubes, and spikey branching arms. Pseudoceratina crassa has been described as having conical-shaped mounds, which divide as it grows, and only containing one oscule. In 2013, a proposition of a new species of Pseudoceratina was proposed. This sponge was found to have a high density of collagen fibrills, which is considered a synapomorphy for the genus Pseudoceratina, but lacks the typical skeletal framework observed in other species of this genus. Instead, this species was found within the structure of a coral. This may indicate plasticity when building a fibrous skeleton for species in the genus Pseudoceratina.

Ecology 
Pseudoceratina clavata can be found in patchy distributions within the Great Barrier Reef at around 15–20 meters deep. The species Pseudoceratina crassa is a brooder which releases its larvae once a year during daylight hours which are yellow and between 1.5–2.0 millimeters. Larvae of this species will settle and begin metamorphizing within 24 hours of being released. It is unsure why, but the larvae is considered distasteful by fish species thus survival rate is not significantly affected by predation. The larvae is released during daylight hours because the juvenile sponges are more susceptible to UV radiation. Adult sponges of the species Pseudoceratina crassa also have mechanisms to prevent predation as it was found that hermit crabs would avoid feeding on samples of this species. Pseudoceratina crassa is one of the most prevalent species of sponges found on the north coast of Jamaica in Discovery Bay Reef where their growth rate was measured following Hurricane Allen in 1980. Following settlement, the sponges can double in size after roughly 257 days during the initial exponential growth period after which growth begins to slow.

Symbionts 
Symbiotic bacteria forming microbiomes within sponges is fairly standard across Porifera. They can provide chemical defenses for the sponge, a necessity for a soft-bodied, sessile creature. Pseudoceratina has been found to produce a number of different brominated alkaloids. The microbiomes of the genus Pseudoceratina are distinctively different compared to other sponges that produce a subclass of bromotyrosine alkaloids indicating that microbiomes are not conserved between taxa and across geography. However, the metabolomes produced are significantly correlated to the composition of the microbiome. A different study that compared the symbionts found in the species Pseudoceratina clavata to Rhabdastrella globostellata, both found on the Great Barrier Reef, showed a similar community structure on both the phylum- and species-level.

The natural products of their symbiotic bacteria can also be utilized for human purposes. Three different species in particular have been studied for their chemical production: Pseudoceratina arabica, Pseudoceratina clavata, and Pseudoceratina purpurpea. Pseudoceratina clavata is the first reported marine invertebrate to contain the genus Salinispora which had previously only been found in marine sediments. The ten strains of bacteria isolated from this species of sponge may control the structure of the sponge's microbial community through antagonistic activity inhibiting the growth of non-Salinospora bacteria. These strains may be useful in biopharmaceutical screenings. The natural products of Pseudoceratina have been used for enzyme inhibition, antimicrobial, parasympatholytic, cytotoxic, and antifouling bioactivites.  Five new brominated alkaloids were isolated from the species Pseudoceratina arabica, found in the Red Sea, and were found to be effective in inhibiting the migration of metastatic breast cancer cells in vitro.

References

Verongimorpha
Sponge genera
Great Barrier Reef
Red Sea
Flora of Jamaica
Taxa named by Henry John Carter